William Robert Vaulks (born 13 September 1993) is a Welsh professional footballer who plays as a midfielder for EFL League One club Sheffield Wednesday and the Wales national team.

He began his professional career at Tranmere Rovers in 2012 but did not make a senior appearance, going on loan to Workington of the Conference North before joining Scottish club Falkirk in February 2013. He played 142 games for the club, including the 2015 Scottish Cup Final and two Scottish Championship play-off finals. In 2016 he joined Rotherham United for an undisclosed fee, where he was Player of the Season as they won the League One playoffs in 2018. In 2019, he signed for Cardiff.

In March 2019 he made his debut for the Welsh national team whom he qualifies for through his mother.

Club career

Tranmere Rovers
Vaulks was born in Wirral, Merseyside and grew up supporting Newcastle United. He began his career with local League One club Tranmere Rovers, signing amateur forms in March 2003, at the age of 9 years old. Vaulks remained with Tranmere and was rewarded with his first professional contract in June 2010. He was called up for one senior match, a 2–1 extra-time win at Chesterfield in the League Cup first round on 13 August 2012, in which he was an unused substitute.

Workington
In August 2012, Vaulks joined Workington of the Conference North. initially on a one-month loan. He made his senior debut on 22 August in a 1–0 loss at Chester, as a 65th-minute substitute for Mark Boyd. His loan was subsequently extended twice, before he signed a permanent deal with Workington at the start of December 2012. He made 24 appearances in all competitions for the Cumbrian club, scoring the equaliser in a 2–1 win over Droylsden at Borough Park.

Falkirk
In February 2013, due to a clause in his Workington contract that allowed him to leave for a professional club, he signed for Scottish Football League First Division side Falkirk. He made his debut on 9 March in a 2–0 loss at Greenock Morton, and ended the season with six appearances.

On 9 November 2013, Vaulks scored his first goal for the Bairns, to open a 4–1 win over Livingston at Falkirk Stadium. In January 2014, Vaulks was called to a trial by English Championship club Blackburn Rovers. He played 42 games over the season, including all four of the play-off games as the club lost 2–1 to Hamilton Academical in the final. He was named in the PFA Scotland Team of the Year for the Scottish Championship in 2013–14. On 10 May 2014, he extended his contract with Falkirk until the end of May 2017.

Vaulks played the full 90 minutes of the 2015 Scottish Cup Final at Hampden Park on 30 May 2015, a 2–1 loss to Inverness Caledonian Thistle. A year later, he played again the play-offs as Falkirk were beaten to a place in the Scottish Premiership by Kilmarnock.

Rotherham United
On 22 July 2016 Vaulks signed for Rotherham United on a three-year deal for an undisclosed fee. He scored on his Rotherham debut in a 2–2 draw with Wolverhampton Wanderers on 6 August. He played 42 times in all competitions during the 2016–17 season as The Millers were relegated to League One.

Vaulks' goal against Blackpool on the last day of the regular season was his 7th goal in 49 games in all competitions as Rotherham finished the 2017–18 season in fourth place hence qualifying for play-offs. After drawing 2–2 away at Scunthorpe United in the first leg, he scored Rotherham's second in the return fixture as they progressed to the final 4–2 on aggregate. In the final he played the full 120 minutes as The Millers beat Shrewsbury Town to win the 2018 EFL League One play-off Final and promotion back to the Championship. At the end of the season Vaulks was given the Rotherham United's Player of the Year award.

On 6 March 2019, Vaulks signed a one-year contract extension. Three days later as captain, he was sent off in the 28th minute of a 2–0 loss at South Yorkshire rivals Sheffield United, for a foul on George Baldock.

Cardiff City 
On 27 June 2019, Vaulks signed for Cardiff City for an undisclosed fee on a three-year deal, in a record sale for Rotherham. He made his debut on 10 August in a 2–1 victory over Luton Town as a second-half substitute in place of Gavin Whyte, and scored his first goal on New Year's Day at the end of a 6–1 loss at Queens Park Rangers.

Vaulks scored twice at home to Brentford on 26 December 2020, but in a 3–2 loss. The following 24 April, after coming on as a last-minute substitute, he was sent off in a 2–1 win over Wycombe Wanderers at the Cardiff City Stadium for a high challenge on Curtis Thompson. On June 10, 2022, Cardiff announced Vaulks would leave the club when his contract expires on June 30.

Sheffield Wednesday
On 21 June 2022, Vaulks would join Sheffield Wednesday following the expiration of his Cardiff City contract. Vaulks made his Wednesday debut, against Portsmouth on 30 July 2022 coming off the bench for Fisayo Dele-Bashiru. On 1 October 2022, he scored his first goal in Wednesday colours against Port Vale, scoring the winning goal.

International career
Vaulks qualifies to play for Wales through his mother, and in March 2019 manager Ryan Giggs called him up to the national team for games against Slovakia and Trinidad and Tobago. He made his debut in the friendly against the Trinidadians at the Racecourse Ground in Wrexham on 20 March, playing the full match and assisting the only goal by Ben Woodburn in added time.

Vaulks made his competitive debut that summer in a 2–1 defeat to Croatia.

Personal life
In January 2023, Vaulks agreed to support the Baton of Hope charity in memory of his two grandfathers.

Career statistics

Club

International

Honours
Falkirk
Stirlingshire Cup: 2013–14
Scottish Cup runner-up: 2014–15

Rotherham United
EFL League One play-offs: 2018

Individual
PFA Scotland Team of the Year: 2013–14 Scottish Championship
Rotherham United Goal of the Season: 2016–17
Rotherham United Player of the Season: 2017–18

References

External links

Falkirk F.C. profile

1993 births
Living people
Sportspeople from Wirral
English footballers
Welsh footballers
Wales international footballers
Association football midfielders
Association football defenders
Tranmere Rovers F.C. players
Workington A.F.C. players
Falkirk F.C. players
Rotherham United F.C. players
Cardiff City F.C. players
Sheffield Wednesday F.C. players
National League (English football) players
Scottish Football League players
Scottish Professional Football League players
English Football League players
English people of Welsh descent
Footballers from Merseyside